C. emoryi may refer to:
 Carex emoryi, the riverbank tussock sedge or Emory's sedge, a plant species
 Castela emoryi, the Crucifixion thorn, a shrub species native to the Mojave and Sonoran Deserts
 Condea emoryi, the desert lavender